Auli Puruburubuane, known professionally as
Jia Jia or Chi Chia-ying; born on 8 January 1983), is a Taiwanese aboriginal singer and songwriter. She was born in Taitung City to a father of Bunun descent and a mother of Puyuma descent. Her uncle is Purdur, the winner of the Best Mandarin Male Singer of the 11th Golden Melody Awards. Her sister is the singer Samingad.

Discography

Studio albums

Live albums

Other works
Mayday 3DNA (五月天追夢3DNA電影原聲帶, 2011)
Prince of Lan Ling Original Soundtrack (兰陵王電視原聲帶, 2013): "Fate" (命運)
MAYDAY NOWHERE World Tour LiVe 2CD (诺亚方舟 世界巡回演唱会Live 2CD, 2013)
Scarlet Heart 2: Original TV Soundtrack (步步驚情電視原聲帶, 2014): "Dust"  (塵埃)

Filmography

Film

Concert tours 
Headlining 
Still Missing Tour (2017)

Opening act
Mayday – Life World Tour (2017)

Awards and nominations

References

External links

Jiajia on B'in Music

1983 births
Living people
Taiwanese Mandopop singers
Taiwanese film actresses
People from Taitung County
Puyuma people
Bunun people
21st-century Taiwanese actresses
21st-century Taiwanese singers
Taiwanese singer-songwriters
21st-century Taiwanese women singers